Fforde may refer to:

 Arthur fforde (1900–1985), British lawyer and businessman
 Cecil Fforde (1875–1951), British barrister, judge and diplomat
 Jasper Fforde (born 1961), English novelist, son of John 
 John Fforde (1921–2000), British economist, economic historian and Chief Cashier of the Bank of England from 1966 to 1970
 Katie Fforde (born 1952), English novelist

See also
 Forde (surname)
 Ford (surname)